Cardiff Draconians Football Club is a Welsh football team based in Gabalfa, Cardiff, Wales. They play in the Ardal Leagues South West which is in the third tier of the Welsh football league system.

History
The Draconians were founded in 1963, receiving special permission to use the Draconians name first used by a Welsh representative side.  In their first season in the Cardiff Combination League, they finished as Second Division champions.

The club changed its name to Gabalfa Draconians at about the time that the Llanidloes Road ground was first used for home games (1984–85 season), before reverting to their original name in 2000 when they entered the South Wales Amateur League.

After finishing as runner-up in the South Wales Alliance League Premier Division in 2019–20 and being granted a tier 3 licence by the Football Association of Wales, the club initially failed to gain a place in the new tier 3. However after the withdrawal and folding of STM Sports, on 3 August 2020 the club was informed that they had been accepted to the new tier 3 Ardal Leagues South West for the 2020–21 season as the highest placed team from the Alliance League who had been awarded a licence.

Honours

South Wales Alliance League Premier Division  –  Runners-up: 2019–20
South Wales Alliance League Division One – Champions: 2016-17
South Wales Alliance League Division Two – Runners-up: 2015-16
South Wales Amateur League Division Two – Champions: 2008–09
South Wales Amateur League Division Two – Runners-up: 2000–01
Cardiff Combination League Senior Division/ Premier Division – Champions (as Cardiff Draconians): 1967–68; 1971–72; 1973–74; 1979–80 
Cardiff Combination League Senior Division/ Premier Division – Champions (as Galbalfa Draconians): 1991–92; 1992–93; 1996–97; 1998–99
Cardiff Combination League Second Division – Champions: 1963–64; 1972–73 (seconds)
Cardiff Combination League Second Division Cup – Winners: 1972–73 (seconds) 
Cardiff Combination League Second Division Cup – Runners-up: 1963–64 
Cardiff Combination League Combination Cup – Winners: 1965–66; 1974–75
WJ Owen Cup – Winners: 2017, 2019
Ardal South Cup – Runners-up: 2021–22

References

External links
Club official website

Football clubs in Wales
South Wales Alliance League clubs
Cardiff Combination League clubs
Sport in Cardiff
Football clubs in Cardiff
South Wales Amateur League clubs
Association football clubs established in 1963
1963 establishments in Wales
Ardal Leagues clubs